Shades of Guilt (German: Schuld nach Ferdinand von Schirach) is a German television series. It was first broadcast on 6 February 2015, on the internet. The television release was on 20 February 2015, on German television channel ZDF. It based on the novel Schuld written by Ferdinand von Schirach. Moritz Bleibtreu plays the main role of the defense lawyer Friedrich Kronberg.

Plot
The lawyer and criminal defense attorney Friedrich Kronberg meets in his cases not only interesting characters from real life, but he is often confronted with moral issues.

Cast
 Main cast
 Moritz Bleibtreu as Friedrich Kronberg
 Guest cast
 The other cast varies in every episode and can be seen in the episode list.

Episodes

Production
The serie is produced by Moovie – the art of entertainment. The filming have started in early April 2014 and lasted until the end of July 2014. It was filmed in and around Berlin, the backdrop of the boarding school is located in Naumburg. The 6th episode was filmed partly in Helmstedt.

Literature
 Ferdinand von Schirach: Schuld. Piper Verlag, München 2010, .

See also
List of German television series

References

External links
 
 Schuld nach Ferdinand von Schirach at ZDF
 Schuld nach Ferdinand von Schirach at Moovie
 Schuld nach Ferdinand von Schirach at fernsehserien.de
 Pressemappe

German drama television series
German crime television series
2015 German television series debuts
Television shows based on short fiction
German-language television shows
ZDF original programming
German legal television series